Behold Homolka is a Czech comedy film directed by Jaroslav Papoušek. It was released in 1970.

Production
In the role of the grandfather Papoušek cast Josef Šebánek, with whom he already worked on Loves of a Blonde, Firemen's Ball and The Most Beautiful Age. In the roles of the twins he cast Miloš Forman's sons Petr and Matěj.

Plot
The film follows a three generation family household in Prague.

Cast
 Josef Šebánek as Grandfather
 Marie Motlová as Grandmother
 František Husák as Ludva
 Helena Růžičková as Heduš
 Petr Forman as Twin Péťa
 Matěj Forman as Twin Máťa
 Yvonne Kodonová as Pavlínka
 Miroslav Jelínek as Jirka
 Jiří Dědík as Man in car
 Růžena Pružinová as Neighbour
 Karel Fridrich as Man in window

References

External links
 

1970 films
1970 comedy films
Czech black-and-white films
1970s Czech-language films
1970s Czech films